National Commission for the Certification of Crane Operators commonly referred to by the acronym NCCCO is a non-profit organization, established in January 1995 and headquartered in Fairfax, Virginia, United States with regional offices in Dunedin, Florida and Murray, Utah for the certification of crane operators.

Organization
The organization is run by a Board of Directors with a President, Vice-President, and 30 Commissioners from 10 industry groups. The Commissioners make up ten Exam Management Committees with the responsibility of monitoring written and practical certification examinations for mobile, tower, overhead, and articulating (loader or knuckle-boom) crane operators, digger derrick operators, crane inspectors, lift directors, signal persons, and riggers, and report to the Board of Directors. There is also an Ethics and Discipline Committee that establishes ethical standards and standards of conduct respectfully.

Accreditation
NCCCO certifications are accredited by the American National Standards Institute (ANSI) for fairness, validity, and reliability in testing, and the covered written and practical testing, including Rigger Level I and II programs. OSHA has recognized NCCCO since 1999.

OSHA
OSHA will begin requiring accredited crane operator certification on November 10, 2018, the final compliance date, but since the 2017 delay the NCCCO has maintained not waiting. The Associated General Contractors of America (AGC) joined with members of the Coalition for Crane Operator Safety (CCOS) and urged Congress to finalize the rule. Most of the crane industry has been against the inclusion of a rated operating capacity (ROC) as well as a provision that the employer evaluate operators concerning their ability to safely operate assigned equipment and document the evaluation. The first part is not included but the employer provision was added back.

References

Organizations established in 1995
501(c)(3) organizations